The Second Collier Ministry was the 18th Ministry of the Government of Western Australia and was led by Labor Premier Philip Collier. It succeeded the Second Mitchell Ministry on 24 April 1933, following the defeat of the Nationalist government at the 1933 election on 8 April.

The ministry was followed by the Willcock Ministry on 27 August 1936, a week after Collier resigned as Premier on the grounds of ill health and handed over to the Deputy Premier, John Willcock.

The following ministers served until the reconstitution of the ministry on 26 March 1935:

On 16 March 1935, Deputy Premier Alick McCallum resigned from the Ministry and from Parliament. On 26 March, Frank Wise filled the vacancy in the Executive Council whilst a reshuffle took place amongst some of the lower-order ministers.

 At the state elections on 15 February 1936, James Kenneally lost his East Perth seat to an Independent Labor candidate, Thomas Hughes. Kenneally and another candidate contested the poll citing Hughes's status as an undischarged bankrupt at the time of the poll (meaning that he was not eligible to stand), and a fresh by-election was called for 9 May, which Hughes won. On 13 May, Kenneally resigned from the Collier Ministry. Bert Hawke replaced him in the Executive Council and in two of his portfolios, whilst Millington and Wise reshuffled portfolios, in part to unite Works and Water Supplies under one minister.
 Willcock assumed all of Collier's portfolios from 20 August 1936 until 27 August 1936 whilst Caucus selected a new Cabinet.

References

 Hansard Indexes for 1933-1936, "Legislature of Western Australia"
  Also 1935:727 (29 March 1935), 1936:684 (13 May 1936), 1936:1113 (23 July 1936) and 1936:1276 (20 August 1936).

Collier 2
Australian Labor Party ministries in Western Australia
Ministries of Edward VIII
Ministries of George V